The MAT.84-F5 is a Chilean, plastic cased, minimum metal anti-tank blast mine. The mine has a small central pressure plate on the top of the case which is made from 3 mm thick, olive green, high-impact plastic. The mine is armed before it is laid by unscrewing a safety plug from the side of the mine. The mine is believed to be in service with the Chilean armed services.

Specifications
 Diameter: 300 mm (approx)
 Height: 120 mm (approx)
 Weight: 10.3 kg
 Explosive content: 9.3 kg of pentolite

References
 Jane's Mines and Mine Clearance 2005-2006
 

Anti-tank mines
Land mines of Chile